African Violet is an album by American trumpeter Blue Mitchell which features arrangements by McKinley Mitchell recorded in 1977 and released on the Impulse! label in 1978.

Track listing
 "Mississippi Jump" (Larry Nash) – 6:38  
 "Ojos de Rojo" (Cedar Walton) – 4:04  
 "Sand Castles" (Dana Kaproff) – 6:08   
 "African Violet" (Steve Hulse) – 6:38  
 "As" (Stevie Wonder) – 6:28   
 "Square Business" (Cedar Walton) – 8:24   
 "Forget" (Don Sebesky) – 6:51 
Recorded at The Burbank Studios in Burbank, California in 1977.

Personnel
Blue Mitchell – trumpet (tracks 1, 2, & 4-6), flugelhorn (tracks 3 & 7)
Herman Riley (tracks 1 & 4), Harold Land (tracks  2, 3 & 5-7) – tenor saxophone
Sonny Burke – electric piano (tracks 1 & 4-7), piano (tracks 2 & 3)
McKinley Jackson (tracks 2, 4 & 7), Michael Boddicker (tracks 3, 5 & 6) – synthesizer 
Lee Ritenour – electric guitar (tracks 1-7), guitar (track 7)
Scott Edwards – bass (track 1), electric bass (tracks 2-4 & 6)
Chuck Domanico – electric bass (track 5), bass (track 7)
James Gadson (tracks 1-4 & 6), Harold Mason (tracks 5 & 7) – drums
Paulinho Da Costa – congas (tracks 1, 2, 4 & 6)
Eddie "Bongo" Brown – congas, percussion (tracks 3, 5 & 7)
Bob Zimmitti – marimba  (track 7), percussion (tracks 5 & 7)
Julia Tillman, Luther Waters, Maxine Willard Waters, Oren Waters – vocals (tracks 3 & 5)
The Sid Sharp Strings (tracks 3 & 7)

References

Impulse! Records albums
Blue Mitchell albums
1978 albums
Albums produced by Esmond Edwards